Orcinus is a genus of Delphinidae, the family of carnivorous marine mammals known as dolphins. It includes the largest delphinid species, Orcinus orca, known as the orca or killer whale. Two extinct species are recognised, Orcinus paleorca and O. citoniensis, describing fossilised remains of the genus. The other extinct species O. meyeri is disputed.

Taxonomy
The genus Orcinus was published by Leopold Fitzinger in 1860, its type species is the orca named by Linnaeus in 1758 as Delphinus orca. Taxonomic arrangements of delphinids published by workers before and after Fitzinger, such as John Edward Gray as Orca in 1846 and Orca (Gladiator) in 1870, are recognised as synonyms of Orcinus. The descriptions of species as Orcinus glacialis Berzin and Vladimirov, 1983 and Orcinus nanus Mikhalev and Ivashin, 1981 are considered synonyms of Orcinus orca, the existing species of orca.

Orcinus means "of the kingdom of the dead", or "belonging to Orcus". This comes from Latin orca used by Ancient Romans for these animals, possibly borrowing Ancient Greek  (óryx) which referred (among other things) to a whale species, perhaps a narwhal. As part of the family Delphinidae, the species is more closely related to other oceanic dolphins than to other whales.

The published names for the genus and their relationship to other delphinids combined epithets such as orca, grampus, gladiator and orcinus throughout the nineteenth century. The instability of this uncertain synonymy was complicated by the repetition of mistakes, a lack of specimens and contradictory descriptions, especially by J. E. Gray. The beaching of whales in Eastern Australia (a female and male Grampus griseus) prompted a taxonomic revision in 1933, the authors Tom Iredale and Ellis Troughton proposed that the extensive use of "Grampus" be conserved as the generic name of orca (Orcinus orca) and that a new genus named Grampidelphis be established for Rissos dolphin (Grampus); the general stability of current species names emerged after the publication of the Philip Hershkovitz's Catalog of Living Whales (US National Museum, 1966).

The type of the genus is Delphinus orca, published by Linnaeus in the 10th edition of Systema Naturae. The type locality was named as "Oceano Europaeo".

Description 
A genus of carnivorous marine mammals, cetaceans of the delphinid family, with teeth in the upper and lower jaws. The possess a large brain which is informed by sophisticated auditory and echolocation techniques. The existing population, known as orca or killer whale, are a well known apex predator readily distinguished by their great size, 7 to 10 metres long, and mostly black and white coloring. These are highly intelligent and gregarious animals, able to communicate, educate, and cooperate in hunting the largest marine animals. The ecotypes within this species complex may coexist in a region, with resident and transient pods being sympatric, but these are known to be genetically isolated. Distinctions within the living Orcinus population are often observed in unique social behaviours, their cultures, which provided a significant evolutionary advantage in moving from a diet of cephlapods and fish to other mammals.

The fossil remains of Orcinus species are frequently teeth, deposited during the Pliocene, especially in Italy. Orcinus citoniensis is known by a well preserved skull and jaw. This specimen was an animal smaller than the orca, around 4 metres in length, and possessed a greater number of proportionally smaller teeth.

The diet of modern orca is wide-ranging, although some ecotypes may be specialist fishers in a local range. Most delphinids feed on cephlapods, squid and octopuses, and earlier Orcinus species are thought to have also exploited this resource. The great size of orcas may have been the result of feeding 'up the foodchain', but the ability to prey on other mammals and the largest whales is proposed instead to be the result of exaptation. The social structure of orcas involves strategems that allow a pod to overcome animals greater in size than the individuals, whereas other great marine predators, such as Carcharodon megalodon, likely exceeded the size of their targets.

Distribution 
A worldwide distribution in a wide range of habitats, deep oceans, continental shelves, arctic seas and coastal regions of every continent, including Antarctica. The modern orca is considered, after humans and their domestic animals, to be the most widely distributed mammal on the planet. Orcinus orca is able to forage at a range of coastal locations, in shallow waters, onto beaches and ice sheets, and into estuaries and rivers. They are not a common animal, but population density increases in favourable habitats of temperate and colder waters with residents and transients.

Fossil evidence of Orcinus species occur in a temporal range of 3.6 million years ago until the present day. The most ancient species Orcinus meyeri refers to fossils of a partial jaw and teeth located at the early Miocene horizon of a site near Stockach in Germany.

Classification 
The classification of Orcinus within subfamilies of delphinids may be summarised as:
 Delphinidae
 Delphininae
 Lissodelphininae
 Globicephalinae
 Orcininae
 Orcinus
 Orcinus citoniensis Capellini, 1883.
 Orcinus meyeri J. F. Brandt, 1873.
 Orcinus orca = Delphinus orca Linnaeus, 1758. The existing population, a complex predicted to include cryptic species and subspecies
 Orcinus paleorca H. Matsumoto, 1937.
Subfamily incertae sedis (Lagenorhynchus albirostris, Lagenorhynchus acutus)

The extant population is considered as a single species, although previously recognised diversity of orca populations suggests a number of cryptic species and subspecies may be recognised.
  
Other members of Orcininae were moved to Globicephalinae, and the relation of Orcinus with other dolphins is unknown.

References

Cetaceans
Cetacean genera
Oceanic dolphins
Taxa named by Leopold Fitzinger
Mammal genera with one living species